

History
The village is located on the Sturt Highway, between Wagga Wagga and Narrandera, at the crossroads with the road to Lockhart.

At the 2016 census, Collingullie had a population of 221 people. The name, Collingullie, could have derived from an Aboriginal word meaning 'boggy ground'.

Collingullie Post Office opened on 1 August 1879 and closed in 1982. The town's school, Collingullie Public School which has 56 students, is located on Urana Street.

In recent years the tiny village of Collingullie has produced two Australian Football League draftees – Matthew Kennedy and Harry Perryman, both playing for the Greater Western Sydney Football Club.

References

External links
 Collingullie Football Club History

Wagga Wagga
Towns in the Riverina
Towns in New South Wales